Pietro Ferrari (24 August 1914 – 1982) was an Italian footballer who played as a goalkeeper. On 12 January 1940, he represented the Italy national football team on the occasion of a friendly match against Austria in a 1–1 home draw.

References

1914 births
1982 deaths
Italian footballers
Italy international footballers
Association football goalkeepers
Bologna F.C. 1909 players
Sportspeople from Reggio Emilia
Footballers from Emilia-Romagna